Geraldine A. Downey is an Irish-American social psychologist. She is the Robert Johnston Niven Professor of Humane Letters in Psychology at Columbia University. Downey is head of The Samuel and Ronnie Heyman Center on Corporate Governance and is a member of the University of the People's arts and sciences advisory board.

Education 
Downey received her BS in psychology from University College Dublin, and her MA and PhD in developmental psychology from Cornell University in 1986.

Career 
Downey is the Vice Provost for Diversity Initiatives and Robert Johnston Niven Professor of Humane Letters in Psychology at the Department of Psychology, Columbia University. She a Fellow of the Association for Psychological Science. Downey heads The Samuel and Ronnie Heyman Center on Corporate Governance and is a director of the Center for Justice at the Columbia University. She is a member of the University of the People's arts and sciences advisory board.

References

External links
 

20th-century births
Living people
American women psychologists
Alumni of University College Dublin
Cornell University alumni
Columbia University faculty
Fellows of the Association for Psychological Science
University of the People faculty
Irish women psychologists
20th-century American psychologists
21st-century American psychologists
American social psychologists
20th-century American women scientists
21st-century American women scientists
20th-century Irish women scientists
21st-century Irish women scientists
Irish emigrants to the United States
Expatriate academics in the United States